KXDP-LD, virtual channel 18 (VHF digital channel 6), is a low-power television station licensed to Denver, Colorado, United States. Owned by Mount Pleasant, South Carolina–based Syncom Media Group, it broadcasts a Regional Mexican radio format as "La Invasora 87.7".

History
Because the station broadcast an analog signal on channel 6, its audio could be received at 87.75 MHz FM. Originally carrying a Spanish format, the station's audio programming changed to sports with ESPN Deportes Radio on July 7, 2010, with English-language local programming on July 27, 2010. The English language programming was soon moved to KDSP 102.3.

The station received its license for digital operation on July 12, 2021, changing its call sign to KXDP-LD, at which point the analog radio signal went silent.

On July 18, 2021, KXDP-LD received special temporary authority from the Federal Communications Commission (FCC) to air its audio signal on 87.75 MHz FM again.

References

XDP-LD
Television channels and stations established in 2003
2003 establishments in Colorado
Low-power television stations in the United States
ATSC 3.0 television stations